Reicheia is a genus of beetles in the family Carabidae, containing the following species:

 Reicheia ambondrombe (Bulirsch, Janák & Moravec, 2005)
 Reicheia andohahelana (Basilewsky, 1976)
 Reicheia antsifotrae (Basilewsky, 1971)
 Reicheia baborica Bruneau De Miré, 1955
 Reicheia balkenohli (Bulirsch & Magrini, 2007)
 Reicheia bergeri (Basilewsky, 1976)
 Reicheia bonsae (Basilewsky, 1973)
 Reicheia brieni Basilewsky, 1951
 Reicheia brisouti Bedel, 1895
 Reicheia calais (V. V. Grebennikov, Bulirsch & Magrini, 2017)
 Reicheia caledonica (Basilewsky, 1980)
 Reicheia camerounensis V. V. Grebennikov, Bulirsch & Magrini, 2009
 Reicheia consocia (Basilewsky, 1980)
 Reicheia corinna Holdhaus, 1924
 Reicheia debeckeri (Basilewsky, 1976)
 Reicheia debruynei Basilewsky, 1951
 Reicheia demirei V. V. Grebennikov, Bulirsch & Magrini, 2009
 Reicheia descarpentriesi (Basilewsky, 1972)
 Reicheia deuvei V. V. Grebennikov, Bulirsch & Magrini, 2009
 Reicheia endroedyi (Bulirsch & Magrini, 2006)
 Reicheia exigua (Jeannel, 1957)
 Reicheia franzi (Basilewsky, 1973)
 Reicheia gracilis (Jeannel, 1958)
 Reicheia grandis (Basilewsky, 1971)
 Reicheia grebennikovi (Bulirsch & Magrini, 2007)
 Reicheia hintelmanni V. V. Grebennikov, Bulirsch & Magrini, 2009
 Reicheia hlavaci (Bulirsch & Magrini, 2006)
 Reicheia hogsbackensis (Bulirsch & Magrini, 2016)
 Reicheia hottentota (Bulirsch & Magrini, 2018)
 Reicheia humicola (Basilewsky, 1980)
 Reicheia irsac Basilewsky, 1953
 Reicheia italica Holdhaus, 1924
 Reicheia janaki (Bulirsch & Magrini, 2016)
 Reicheia jarmilae (Bulirsch & Magrini, 2006)
 Reicheia jeanneli Basilewsky, 1951
 Reicheia kaboboana (Basilewsky, 1960)
 Reicheia kabyliana Bruneau De Miré, 1955
 Reicheia kahuziana Basilewsky, 1951
 Reicheia leleupi Basilewsky, 1951
 Reicheia leleupiana (Basilewsky, 1980)
 Reicheia lindrothi (Basilewsky, 1980)
 Reicheia lucifuga Saulcy, 1862
 Reicheia marginodentata Basilewsky, 1951
 Reicheia moritai Balkenohl, 2005
 Reicheia numida Jeannel, 1957
 Reicheia palustris Saulcy, 1870
 Reicheia pauliani (Jeannel, 1958)
 Reicheia peyrierasi (Basilewsky, 1972)
 Reicheia promontorii Péringuey, 1896
 Reicheia sciakyi (Bulirsch & Magrini, 2007)
 Reicheia subgrandis (Basilewsky, 1976)
 Reicheia subterranea Putzeys, 1866
 Reicheia transita (Basilewsky, 1976)
 Reicheia tsitsikamae (Basilewsky, 1980)
 Reicheia uluguruana (Basilewsky, 1962)
 Reicheia valida (Jeannel, 1957)
 Reicheia vandenberghei Basilewsky, 1951
 Reicheia viettei (Basilewsky, 1976)
 Reicheia vohidray (Bulirsch, Janák & Moravec, 2005)
 Reicheia zetes (V. V. Grebennikov, Bulirsch & Magrini, 2017)

References

Scaritinae